Bad Astronaut is an American indie/alternative rock band founded in 2000 by Joey Cape, singer from Lagwagon. In Bad Astronaut, Joey Cape explores a style of alternative rock, with lyrics often about deep and intricate personal matters.

The band released its debut album, Acrophobe in 2001, followed by Houston: We Have a Drinking Problem in 2002 on Honest Don's Records. The band released its third and final album, Twelve Small Steps, One Giant Disappointment on November 14, 2006, on Fat Wreck Chords. Upon the album's release, Joey Cape announced, "without Derrick, there is no Bad Astronaut" on the band's Myspace page, deciding the resulting record would be the last for Bad Astronaut. (Drummer Derrick Plourde committed suicide in March 2005.) Joey Cape expressed plans on releasing a b-sides album sometime in the future. Bad Astronaut reformed to play their first live shows in July 2010. They played four shows in California, with Mike Hale of In the Red and Joey Cape doing a solo act as the openers. On December 2, 2016, Fat Wreck Chords announced that Erik Herzog had died.

Discography
War of the Worlds (2001, Owned & Operated – split with Armchair Martian)
Acrophobe (2001, Honest Don's Records)
Houston: We Have a Drinking Problem (2002, Honest Don's Records)
Twelve Small Steps, One Giant Disappointment (2006, Fat Wreck Chords)

Music videos
 "The Passenger" (2002)

Band members
 Joey Cape – Lead Vocals, Guitar
 Marko DeSantis –  Bass
 Derrick Plourde – Drums (deceased)
 Angus Cooke – Cello, Percussion, Vocals
 Thom Flowers – Guitar, Vocals
 Jonathan Cox – Keyboard
 Todd Capps – Keyboard, Vocals
 Erik Herzog – Drums (deceased)

References

External links
 

Punk rock groups from California
Musical groups established in 2000
Fat Wreck Chords artists